Yuri Shevchuk or Yuriy Shevchuk may refer to:

 Yuri Shevchuk (born 1957), Russian musician
 Yuri Shevchuk (figure skater) (born 1990), Russian figure skater
 Yuriy Shevchuk (footballer) (born 1985), Ukrainian footballer